Karolino-Buhaz rural hromada is a rural hromada in Bilhorod-Dnistrovskyi Raion of Odesa Oblast in southwestern Ukraine. The residence of the hromada is Karolino-Buhaz. It also includes the urban-type settlement of Zatoka. Population: 

Until 18 July 2020, the hromada belonged to Ovidiopol Raion. The raion was abolished in July 2020 as part of the administrative reform of Ukraine, which reduced the number of raions of Odesa Oblast to seven. The area of Ovidiopol Raion was split between Bilhorod-Dnistrovskyi and Odesa Raions, with Karolino-Buhaz rural hromada being transferred to Bilhorod-Dnistrovskyi Raion.

References

Bilhorod-Dnistrovskyi Raion
Hromadas of Odesa Oblast